1 ball may refer to:
 1 ball, the pool (pocket billiards) ball numbered "1" and colored yellow
 1 ball, a red snooker ball, worth 1 point, normally referred to as "a red"

See also
 1-ball